Notable people bearing the name Soni include:

Last name
Ambika Soni, the former minister in charge of Ministry of Information and Broadcasting in UPA government.
Anup Soni (born 1965), an Indian film and television actor
Bimal Soni, ex-manager of the Indian cricket team, ex-president of the Jaipur District Cricket Association
Hešeri Sonin, one of four regents for the Kangxi Emperor of the Qing dynasty in 1660s China
Jay Soni
Jayshree Soni
Jitu Soni, a Tanzanian CCM politician and Member of Parliament for Babati Rural constituency since 2010
Kanishka Soni
Kévin Soni (born 1998), Cameroonian professional footballer
Naveen Soni
Om Parkash Soni, former deputy chief minister of Punjab
Rebecca Soni, an American swimmer
Samir Soni, actor
Satish Soni
Shantilal Soni

Indian surnames
Punjabi-language surnames